Drum Corps Associates (DCA) is a governing body for modern all-age and senior drum and bugle corps in North America. DCA's responsibilities include sanctioning competitions, certifying adjudicators, maintaining and enforcing rules of competition, and hosting an annual World Championship during Labor Day weekend. Historically, DCA members were referred to as "senior corps" in contrast to the "junior corps", who limit participants to a maximum 22 years of age. DCA has no age restriction. The term "all-age corps" has come into common use.

DCA is viewed as a counterpart to Drum Corps International (DCI), which governs junior drum corps in North America.

In March 2020, the entire competitive season, including the 2020 World Championships, was cancelled due to the ongoing coronavirus pandemic.

History 
In August 1963, Almo Sebastianelli, sponsor of the annual Parade of Champions drum corps competition, approached Henry Mayer, then-director of the New York Skyliners, to discuss problems affecting show sponsors and competing corps. Following their discussions, Sebastianelli and Mayer organized a meeting later that month, which was attended by representatives from the Archer-Epler Musketeers, Reading Buccaneers, Yankee Rebels, and the New York Skyliners. Five areas of concern were identified during the meeting:
 Conflicting contest dates.
 Inconsistent contest formats.
 Inconsistent adjudication.
 Uneven distribution prize money.
 Need to promote better relationships between competing corps.

At a second meeting held sometime in September 1963, by-laws for a new governing body were adopted, as well as the adoption of the name Drum Corps Associates. Mayer was elected the first DCA president. Charter members were: Reading Buccaneers, Connecticut Hurricanes, Interstatesmen, Archer-Epler Musketeers, Pittsburgh Rockets, Yankee Rebels, and the New York Skyliners.

DCA sanctioned one event in 1964, the 12th Annual Tournament of Drums in Waverly, New York. The first DCA World Championship was held in Milford, Connecticut on 11 September 1965. The Reading Buccaneers won the first of their sixteen championship titles at this inaugural event.

Hawthorne Caballeros joined DCA in 1966, along with the Sunrisers, and Brigadiers. The Rochester Crusaders joined in 1967. The number of corps competing in Open Class reached twenty-three in 1987. In 2008, twenty-four corps competed at World Championship, twelve in Open Class and Class A each.

Corps from Canada have been frequent competitors since DCA's founding, such as Les Metropolitains from Montreal, and Les Dynamiques from Buckingham, Quebec. The Kingston Grenadiers, from Toronto, competed in 2010. Yokohama Inspires, from Japan, competed in 2005. The most recent competitors from the United Kingdom were Kidsgrove Scouts from Kidsgrove in 2017, and Cadence from Guildford in 2018.

Past championship locations

About 
Headquartered in South Orange, New Jersey, DCA was incorporated as a nonprofit organization with the New Jersey Department of the Treasury on June 8, 1977. DCA is designated a 501(c)(3) organization by the IRS.

Active corps

Classification and adjudication 
Currently, DCA assigns all competing corps to four classes. No arrangements are made for corps from outside North America, as the same classification and adjudication applies to all competing corps. With the exception of Mini-corps, all field corps perform in competition as one continuous flight, but scores and rankings are given by class.

Current Classes 
World Class corps typically march between 86 and 128 members who compete at the highest level.

Open Class corps typically march between 65 and 85 members.

A Class corps are small, often young and developing groups, who typically march between 24 and 64 members.

Mini-corps is a special class reserved for very small groups consisting of horns, and percussion or rhythm sections. These groups typically compete on a theater stage, and not on a football field, and are often no larger than twenty members. A mini-corps championships is held the day before World Championship prelims.

Historical classes and divisions 
DCA realigned its competitive classes in 1997, and again in 2001. In 2022, DCA realigned its competitive classes based on ensemble size—World, Open, and A classes.

Adjudication 
DCA's Adjudication Manual is based on three broad categories, Visual, Music and Effect. Visual and Music categories are further subdivided into three reference criteria, or captions: one caption for each of a corps' sections, and two ensemble performance captions. Unlike other adjudication manuals, DCA's manual does include captions for individual or ensemble analysis, or design or effect analysis.

The manual includes definitions for appropriate, and achievement, in lieu of proficiency, or attempt. This vocabulary reflects the style of programming utilized by modern all-age corps. Audience entertainment and engagement are also important factors in adjudication as well. Prior to 2011, nine adjudicators were required for each competition, using a different manual. The "European Music Games" adjudication manual published by Drum Corps Europe (DCE) was adapted from the previous DCA format.

Past champions 
DCA realigned its championships classes in 1997 with the introduction of A Class, and again in 2000 with the introduction of Mini-corps into competition. In 2022, DCA realigned classes based on ensemble size which split DCA member corps between three new divisions—World, Open, and A classes.

At the 2022 World Championships, the Hurricanes won their fourth class championship: three championships in Open Class between 1967 and 1981, and a fourth as champions of the new Open Class. Also in 2022, the Buccaneers won World Class bringing their premier class championships to eighteen, and Fusion Core won their second championship in A Class.

See also 
 Drum Corps Europe
 Drum Corps International
 Drum Corps Japan
 Drum Corps United Kingdom
 Winter Guard International

Notes

References

External links 
 
 
 

Drum and bugle corps
1964 establishments in the United States
Organizations established in 1964
Organizations based in New Jersey
South Orange, New Jersey